James Sykes (March 27, 1761 – October 18, 1822) was an American physician and politician from Dover, in Kent County, Delaware. He was a member of the Federalist Party, who served in the Delaware General Assembly and as Governor of Delaware.

Early life and family
James Sykes was born near Dover, Delaware, the son of James and Agnes Sykes. His father was a member of the Delaware General Assembly and a delegate to the Continental Congress. James Jr. studied medicine under Dr. Joshua Clayton and first practiced in Cambridge, Maryland. While there he married Elizabeth Goldsborough, daughter of Judge Robert Goldsborough. After four years they returned to Dover living on The Green. They had three children; James, Anna Matilda, and William, and were members of Christ Episcopal Church. Their house is now an office building.

Professional and political career
In 1791 the Delaware General Assembly appointed Sykes to help manage a lottery to raise one thousand pounds to defray expenses incurred in constructing a new state house. After serving as clerk for the State House in 1796, he was elected to the State Senate in 1793. He served one term for the 1794, 1795, and 1796 sessions. Returning a year later, he served six more terms from the 1798 session through the 1812 session. He was Speaker in 1801, and then in every session from 1804 through 1812.

On February 20, 1801, Governor Richard Bassett resigned following his appointment as U.S. Circuit Court Judge by U.S. President John Adams. As the Speaker of the State Senate, Sykes was next in line of succession and took office as governor. He chose not to run for election in his right, and returned to the State Senate on January 19, 1802.

In the meantime, Sykes had become one of the state's most renowned surgeons. From his office at 45 The Green in Dover, he specialized in treating gallstones and yellow fever. In 1814 he moved his practice to New York City for six years, but then returned to the Dover practice with his son, James. In 1822 he became President of the Delaware Medical Society.

Death and legacy
Sykes died at Dover and is buried there in the Christ Episcopal Church Cemetery. His son, James, was a physician in Dover and his son, William, was the father of Major General George Sykes, a commander at Gettysburg in the American Civil War.

Almanac
Elections were held the first Tuesday of October, and members of the General Assembly took office the first Tuesday of January. State senators had a three-year term. The governor took office the third Tuesday of January and had a three-year term. However, Sykes served as State President, only filling the vacancy caused by the resignation of Richard Bassett.

Places with more information
 Delaware Historical Society; website; 505 North Market Street, Wilmington, Delaware 19801; (302) 655-7161
 University of Delaware; Library website; 181 South College Avenue, Newark, Delaware 19717; (302) 831–2965

References

External links
 Biographical Directory of the Governors of the United States
 Delaware’s Governors
 
 The Political Graveyard

1761 births
1822 deaths
People from Dover, Delaware
American surgeons
Delaware Federalists
Delaware state senators
Governors of Delaware
Federalist Party state governors of the United States
Physicians from Delaware
People of colonial Delaware
Burials in Dover, Delaware
19th-century American Episcopalians